The  is an automobile nameplate used by two SUVs sold by Honda in the Japanese Domestic Market. The first one is a rebadged Land Rover Discovery sold in Japan between 1993 and 1998, while the second version is a more compact crossover vehicle introduced in 2007.

First generation (LJ/LJJ; 1993) 

Honda marketed the Crossroad in the Japanese market from October 1993 to 1998. To date, the Crossroad is the only production vehicle sold by Honda to ever have a V8 engine. The 3.9-liter Rover unit produces .

Problems had emerged regarding the marketing of the Crossroad in Japan. For instance, Honda had threatened to end ties with Rover after the news that it was going to be sold to BMW. Since the Crossroad was a rebadged Land Rover Discovery, it also had Land Rover's mechanical and reliability issues carried over. In 1997, a recall was issued by Honda on the advice of Ministry of Transportation due to a malfunction locking mechanism on the SUV's driver-side front door that could make the vehicle open while driving. Around 4,754 vehicles made from July 1995 to December 1996 were affected by the recall.

Second generation (RT; 2007) 

The Crossroad name was resurrected as a new crossover SUV for the Japanese market in February 2007. The vehicle combines the exterior design of an SUV with the convenient size of a compact car and the 3-row seating and 7-passenger capacity. The Crossroad is designed for people to enjoy their active new lifestyles, targeting young couples in their 20s and 30s with small children.

Under the hood, the Crossroad sports one of two straight-4 engines of 1.8 L and 2.0 L in displacement. Both will be mated to the only available transmission: a 5-speed automatic. Honda's Real-Time AWD system has been thoroughly revised for the Crossroad. It now works in conjunction with stability and traction control as well as ABS brakes. For the first time in a Honda, the Crossroad will be equipped with Hill-Start Assist which temporarily maintains brake pressure after the brake pedal is released when starting on a hill. Under normal driving conditions, the Crossroad behaves as a FWD vehicle.

According to AutoWeek, Honda said it won't import the Crossroad to North America, since their similarly sized Element takes its place.  Honda's crossover SUV lineup in the United States and Canada already has the Element, the mid-priced CR-V and the larger Pilot, as all three models are made in North America.

It was reported that Honda did not export the Crossroad to Europe because of a voluntary commitment by the Japan Automobile Manufacturers Association to reduce average  emissions in its European fleet to 140 grams per kilometer by 2009. As a result, Honda was reluctant to offer larger vehicles without technological breakthrough.

On August 25, 2010, Honda announced the discontinuation of the Crossroad.

References 

1990s cars
2000s cars
2010s cars
All-wheel-drive vehicles
Front-wheel-drive vehicles
Crossroad
Mini sport utility vehicles
Rear-wheel-drive vehicles
Sport utility vehicles